Siti Zailah binti Mohd Yusoff (Jawi: سيتي ظل ﷲ بنت محمد يوسف; born 12 October 1963) is a Malaysian politician who has served as the Member of Parliament (MP) for Rantau Panjang since March 2008. She served as the Deputy Minister of Women, Family and Community Development for the second term in the Barisan Nasional (BN) administration under former Prime Minister Ismail Sabri Yaakob and former Minister Rina Harun from August 2021 to the collapse of the BN administration in November 2022 and the first term in the Perikatan Nasional (PN) administration under former Prime Minister Muhyiddin Yassin and former Minister Rina from March 2020 to the collapse of the PN administration in August 2021. She is a member and Women Chief of the Malaysian Islamic Party (PAS),.

Political career
She was elected to the Dewan Rakyat, the lower house of the Parliament of Malaysia for Rantau Panjang in the 2008 general election. Before her election she was a Senator for Kelantan, an appointed position. She won the seat again in the 2013 general election.

In 2011, she was elected as the head of PAS Muslimat, the women's wing of PAS. She retained the post in the 2013 party elections.

Controversies and issues
In July 2014, after the shootdown of Malaysia Airlines Flight 17, Siti Zailah stated that in light of the possibility of "Allah's wrath", Malaysia Airlines should stop serving alcohol and revise the dress code of the female flight attendants, and especially so for Muslim females. Empower, the non-governmental organization criticized her statements, accusing them of being "insensitive and irrelevant".

During the COVID-19 outbreak in March 2020, Siti Zailah, the newly appointed deputy minister for women and family development brought up the question of shariah-compliant uniforms at a time when airline staff were facing likely job cuts, resulting from the COVID-19 outbreak causing a worldwide collapse in travel demand, in Parliament. She faced backlash from the National Union of Flight Attendants Malaysia, and from both the public and former Youth and Sports minister YB Syed Saddiq.

Within the same period, she made a post on Twitter, noting that "The fatality rate for COVID-19 is only just 1%, but the chances of us dying at any moment is 100%. Renew our faith and be afraid of Allah, as death is something that is genuine, and comes without invitation". After much blowback on social media, she temporarily closed her Twitter account.

In February 2022, she made an Instagram video telling husbands how to punish their wives for "unruly" behavior. She suggested that a husband should start by communicating and if that fails, he should refuse to sleep with his wife. If the wife still does not change her behavior, Siti recommended husbands beat their wives "gently" and use the “bodily contact method” as punishment. This led to outcries from the women's rights coalition Joint Action Group for Gender Equality and from its members such as Sisters in Islam, the Women's Aid Organisation, the Women's Centre for Change, calling for her to step down.

Election results

Honours
  :
  Knight Commander of the Order of the Life of the Crown of Kelantan (DJMK) – Dato' (2019)

See also

Rantau Panjang (federal constituency)

References

Living people
1963 births
People from Kelantan
Malaysian people of Malay descent
Malaysian Muslims
Malaysian Islamic Party politicians
Members of the Dewan Negara
Members of the Dewan Rakyat
Women members of the Dewan Negara
Women members of the Dewan Rakyat
Women in Kelantan politics
21st-century Malaysian women politicians
21st-century Malaysian politicians